Eugène Mayor (7 June 1877, Neuchâtel – 14 September 1976, Neuchâtel) was a Swiss physician and mycologist.

He studied medicine in Geneva, and from 1906 worked as a physician in his hometown of Neuchâtel. In 1910, with parasitologist Otto Fuhrmann, he embarked on a scientific expedition to Colombia, about which, the book "Voyage d'exploration scientifique en Colombie" was written. From 1913 to 1942 he served as a physician at the cantonal hospice of Perreux-sur-Boudry (Neuchâtel).

During his career he received honorary degrees form the universities of Bern and Neuchâtel. From 1912 to 1914 he was president of the Société Neuchâteloise des Sciences Naturelles. He was the author of numerous articles on mycology (Notes mycologiques) in the publication, "Bulletin de la Société Neuchâteloise".

Selected works 
 Contribution a l’étude des champignons du Canton de Neuchâtel, 1911 – Contribution to the study of fungi of the canton of Neuchâtel.
 Recherches expérimentales sur quelques urédinées hétéroiques, 1911 – Experimental research on some heteroecious rusts.
 Contribution à l’étude de la flore cryptogamique du Canton du Valais, 1911 (with Denis Cruchet, Paul Cruchet) – Contribution to the study of cryptogamic flora of the canton of Valais.
 Contribution à l’etude des urédinées de Colombie, 1913 – Contribution to the study of rusts of Colombia.
 Les maladies de nos cultures maraichères, 1915.
 Contribution à l’étude des micromycètes de Languedoc et de Provence, 1949 (with Georges Viennot-Bourgin) – Contribution to the study of microfungi of Languedoc and Provence.
 Contribution à l’étude des micromycètes de Corse, 1950 (with Georges Viennot-Bourgin) – Contribution to the study of microfungi of Corsica.
 Contribution à la connaissance de micromycètes de la Côte d’Ivoire, 1951 (with Georges Viennot-Bourgin) – Contribution to the knowledge of microfungi of the Ivory Coast.

References 

1877 births
1976 deaths
People from Neuchâtel
Swiss mycologists